Holmås is a surname. Notable people with the surname include:

Heikki Holmås (born 1972), Norwegian politician
Stig Holmås (born 1946), Norwegian librarian, poet, novelist and children's writer

Norwegian-language surnames